Licking Township is one of ten townships in Crawford County, Illinois, USA.  As of the 2010 census, its population was 448 and it contained 167 housing units.

Geography

Unincorporated towns
 Bellair
 Kibbie
(This list is based on USGS data and may include former settlements.)

Cemeteries
The township contains these five cemeteries: Bellair, Duggan, Harmony, Prairie Grove and Randolph.

Demographics

School districts
 Casey-Westfield Community Unit School District 4c
 Hutsonville Community Unit School District 1
 Oblong Community Unit School District 4

Political districts
 Illinois' 15th congressional district
 State House District 109
 State Senate District 55

References

 
 United States Census Bureau 2007 TIGER/Line Shapefiles
 United States National Atlas

External links
 City-Data.com
 Illinois State Archives

Townships in Crawford County, Illinois
Townships in Illinois